Vits may refer to:

People

Surname
 Ernst Hellmut Vits (1903–1970), German lawyer
 Henry Vits (1842–1921), American businessman and politician
 Mia De Vits (born 1950), Belgian politician

Given name
 Vīts Rimkus (born 1973), Latvian football player

Other
 Vignan Institute of Technology and Science (VITS)
 vertical interval test signal inserter (VITS inserter)

See also

 Vit (disambiguation)
 Vitus (disambiguation)